The Norwegian Research Council for Science and the Humanities (Norges almenvitenskapelige forskningsråd, NAVF) was one of Norway's five research councils. It was established in 1949. NAVF was responsible for funding the natural sciences. In 1993, the five research councils merged into the present Norwegian Research Council.

Organizations established in 1949
Research institutes in Norway